Bedford Township is a township in Taylor County, Iowa, in the United States.

History
Bedford Township was established in 1880.

References

Townships in Taylor County, Iowa
Townships in Iowa
1880 establishments in Iowa
Populated places established in 1880